Ononis spinosa is a flowering plant belonging to the family Fabaceae, that is commonly known as spiny restharrow or just restharrow. It is found throughout much of Europe including Britain, but seldom as far north as Scotland.

Description
Spiny restharrow is an erect, bushy perennial. The leaves are small, dark green, oval or trefoil, with toothed leaf-like stipules at their base. The flowers are deep pink and white, with the wings shorter than the hooked keel, and the calyx usually shorter than the pod.

Distribution and habitat
Spiny restharrow is found in southern temperate areas of Europe and Siberia. In the British Isles it occurs predominantly in central and southeastern England. Its typical habitat is lime-rich but nutrient-poor grassland on chalk and heavy, calcareous soils. It grows in the Plaster's Green Meadows, an SSSI in Lincolnshire.

Historical use
In medieval Russia, it was used for manufacturing Bulat steel. Though the original process is now lost, it is known it involved dipping the finished weapon into a vat containing a special liquid of which spiny restharrow extract was a part (the plant's name in Russian, stalnik, reflects its historical role), then holding the sword aloft while galloping on a horse, allowing it to dry and harden against the wind.

In traditional Russian herbal medicine, it was used as an anodyne, antiphlogistic, aperient, coagulant and diuretic. A decoction of restharrow was used for eczema and other skin problems, hemorrhoids, chronic constipation, and infections of the anus.

References

External links

spinosa
Medicinal plants of Europe
Plants described in 1753
Subshrubs
Taxa named by Carl Linnaeus